Jackson Dietrich (born 27 September 1996) is a German professional footballer who plays as a midfielder or forward for USL League One side Northern Colorado Hailstorm.

Career

Youth
Dietrich was born in Bremen in Germany, and was part of the Werder Bremen and FC Oberneuland academy systems. When his family moved to the United States, Dietrich played for the Las Vegas Sports Academy where he helped lead them to four state championships and a 2014 Region IV title.

College and amateur
Dietrich spent four years playing college soccer at Wright State University between 2015 and 2019, missing the 2017 season due to injury. During his time with the Raiders, Dietrich made 78 appearances, scoring 14 goals and tallying 34 assists, helping the tema to a Horizon League Title in his senior year.

Whilst at college, Dietrich also played in the USL League Two for Dayton Dutch Lions in both 2018 and 2019.

Professional
On 9 December 2020, Dietrich joined USL League One side Chattanooga Red Wolves ahead of their 2021 season. He made his debut on 8 May 2021, appearing as a 63rd-minute substitute during a 1–0 win over North Texas SC.

On 21 July 2022, Dietrich signed with USL League One club Northern Colorado Hailstorm.

References

External links
 
 

1996 births
Living people
Sportspeople from Las Vegas
German footballers
Footballers from Bremen
Soccer players from Nevada
Association football midfielders
USL League One players
USL League Two players
Wright State Raiders men's soccer players
Dayton Dutch Lions players
Chattanooga Red Wolves SC players
Northern Colorado Hailstorm FC players
German expatriate footballers
German expatriate sportspeople in the United States
Expatriate soccer players in the United States